Santa Fe, officially the Municipality of Santa Fe,  is a 5th class municipality in the province of Cebu, Philippines. According to the 2020 census, it has a population of 34,471 people.

The municipality's territory occupies the southeastern portion of Bantayan Island (marching with the municipality of Bantayan), together with the islands of Guintacan (or Kinatarkan), Hilantagaan and Hilantagaan Diot (or Silion). Because the island's airport and principal ferry port are both located within the municipality, Santa Fe is considered the gateway to Bantayan and its islands.

Geography
Santa Fe is bordered to the north by the town of Bantayan, to the west also by Bantayan, to the east is the town of Medellin and to the south is the Tañon Strait

Barangays

Santa Fe comprises 10 barangays:

Climate

Demographics

Religion
The two predominant religions in the municipality are the Roman Catholic Church and the Iglesia Filipina Independiente (Philippine Independent Church).

Economy

Although there is some small-scale industry, the municipality's principal source of income is fishing and agriculture, and from holidaymakers who come in large numbers, most notably during Holy Week, to enjoy the particularly fine white sand and uncrowded beaches.

Transport

Bantayan Airport, serving the whole Bantayan Island, is located in Santa Fe. Air Juan operates scheduled flights between Mactan Airport three days a week. The town can also be reached by ferry from Hagnaya Wharf in San Remigio, Cebu.

Gallery

References

External links

 [ Philippine Standard Geographic Code]

Municipalities of Cebu
Beaches of the Philippines